Gelsenkirchen Hauptbahnhof is a railway station in the German city of Gelsenkirchen. It connects the city to the regional and long-distance rail service of Deutsche Bahn and other railway companies in Germany.

History
The Gelsenkirchen railway station was opened in 1847 with the Cologne-Minden railway. The station has since been rebuilt two times. The first time was in 1904, because the capacity of the old station was no longer sufficient. Since then the station has been a Hauptbahnhof. As part of this construction project, the tracks, which were located at ground level at the time, were raised. This allowed for traffic to Bochum could happen freely pass through. The second new development was carried out from 1982 to 1983. In preparations for the 2006 FIFA World Cup the station underwent extensive renovations.

On 4 August 1914, English civilian Henry Hadley was fatally shot by a German officer while their train was standing at the station. Dying the next day, shortly after war was declared, he is sometimes described as the "first British casualty" of World War I.

Operational usage
The station has connect to the InterCity trains towards Norddeich Mole via Münster and Luxembourg via Cologne. To the week-end, even some ICE-trains connecting Munich or Hamburg stop here. It is also an important connection point for RegionalExpress and RegionalBahn lines to Hamm, Düsseldorf, Münster and Essen and has a S-Bahn line of the Rhein-Ruhr S-Bahn calling at the station. The Stadtbahn station below the Hauptbahnhof offers local connections by tram to GE-Buer/Horst, Bochum and Essen.

References

External links

Railway stations in North Rhine-Westphalia
Rhine-Ruhr S-Bahn stations
S2 (Rhine-Ruhr S-Bahn)
Buildings and structures in Gelsenkirchen
Railway stations in Germany opened in 1847
1847 establishments in Prussia